Monocostus is a group of plants in the  Costaceae described as a genus in 1904. There is only one known species, Monocostus uniflorus, endemic to Peru.

References

Costaceae
Monotypic Zingiberales genera
Flora of Peru